All My Bad Thoughts was the third LP from The Montgolfier Brothers. It was released through the Vespertine and Son label in 2005.

Track listing
"The First Rumours of Spring" – 3:58
"Don't Get Upset If I..." – 2:32
"All My Bad Thoughts" – 4:01
"Sins and Omissions" – 5:21
"Stopping for Breath" – 2:49
"Koffee Pot" – 4:56
"Brecht's Lost Waltz / Summer Is Over" – 4:58
"Quite an Adventure" – 2:04
"Journey's End" – 8:09
"It's Over, It's Ended, It's Finished, It's Done" – 8:18

References

2005 albums